Foster Ellenborough Lascelles Beal (9 January 1840 – 30 September 1916) was an American pioneer of economic ornithology. 

Beal was born in South Groton, Massachusetts the son of Jacob Foster Beal, a school teacher, railroad foreman, and farmer and Sarah Jane Day. His father died of tuberculosis when he was eight and since his mother had also contracted the illness, he was left to the care of Nathaniel C. Day, his mother's,  cousin once removed. He never saw his mother, who died before he turned ten. He was taken care of by Mrs Day. During the Civil War, he enlisted with the army in 1864 and joined the 36th Massachusetts Regiment. He fell ill with tuberculosis and was discharged from the army. He recovered and tried to work in gardening. He then joined the first few students of the Massachusetts Institute of Technology and graduated in 1872. He worked for a while in civil engineering at Fitchburg and also taught mathematics at MIT from 1870 to 1874. In 1874 until 1875 he was an assistant professor of mathematics at the United States Naval Academy at Annapolis, MD. In 1876 he joined the agricultural college in Ames, Iowa as a professor of civil engineering but a few months later became professor of zoology and comparative anatomy holding those positions until 1883. Professor Beal joined the Department of Agriculture, in Washington, DC, in 1891. He specialized in economic ornithology and wrote a number of books on the subject. He was a member of the Biological Society of Washington and a fellow in the American Ornithological Union. He died in Branchville, Prince Georges County, Maryland. He married Mary Louise Barnes in 1877.

References

External links 
 Preliminary report on the food of woodpeckers (1895)
 Some common birds in their relation to agriculture (1897)
 Cuckoos and shrikes in relation to agriculture (1898)
 Food of the bobolink, blackbirds, and grackles (1900)
 Birds of California in relation to the fruit industry. Part I. (1907)
 Food of the woodpeckers of the United States (1911)
 Food of some well-known birds of forest, farm, and garden (1912)
 Food of our more important flycatchers (1912)
 Birds of California in relation to the fruit industry. Part II. (1910)
 Food habits of the thrushes of the United States (1915)
 Food of the robins and bluebirds of the United States (1915)
 Some common birds useful to the farmer (1915)
 Food habits of the swallows : a family of valuable native birds
 Common birds of southeastern United States in relation to agriculture (1923)
 Some common birds useful to the farmer (1942)

American ornithologists
1840 births
1916 deaths
Union Army personnel
People of Massachusetts in the American Civil War
Massachusetts Institute of Technology alumni
Massachusetts Institute of Technology faculty
United States Naval Academy faculty
United States Department of Agriculture officials